A moral is a message that is conveyed or a lesson to be learned from a story or event.

Moral or morals may also refer to:
 Morals or morality, the differentiation of intentions, decisions and actions between those that are distinguished as proper and those that are improper
 Moral Township, Shelby County, Indiana
 Morals (film), a 1921 film
 Moral (1928 film), a German film
 Moral (1982 film), a Filipino film

See also
 The Immoralist, a novel by André Gide 
 "Moral of the Story" (song), a 2019 song by Ashe
 Morale, the capacity of a group's members to maintain belief in the face of opposition or hardship
 Morality (novella), a novella by Stephen King